National Brain Research Centre is a research institute in Manesar, Gurgaon, India. as for autonomous institute  under the Department of Biotechnology, Ministry of Science and Technology , Government of India. The institute is dedicated to research in neuroscience and brain functions in health and diseases using multidisciplinary approaches. This is the first autonomous institute by DBT to be awarded as the deemed to be university by the Ministry of Education, formerly known as the Ministry of Human Resource Development, in May 2002. NBRC (National Brain Research Centre) was dedicated to the nation by the Honorable President of India Dr. A.P.J. Abdul Kalam in December 2003. The founder chairman of NBRC Society is Prof. Prakash Narain Tandon, whereas the founder director Prof. Vijayalakshmi Ravindranath was followed by Prof. Subrata Sinha and Prof. Neeraj Jain. The current director of NBRC is Prof. Krishanu Ray.

The institute pursues research to understand brain functions in health and diseases, generate trained human resources with the capability to conduct interdisciplinary research in neuroscience, and promote neuroscience in India through networking among national institutions. NBRC is the only institute in India dedicated to neuroscience research and education. Scientists and students in NBRC, come from diverse academic backgrounds, including  ; biological, computational, mathematical, physical, engineering and medical sciences.

History

On 5 October 1995, the proposal for founding NBRC was put forward. The creation was subsequently declared on 14 November 1997 as a part of the Golden Jubilee celebrations of India's Independence and the birth anniversary of the former Prime Minister, the architect of modern science, Jawaharlal Nehru. A Management Advisory Committee was further formed. In 2000, the institute commenced functioning as an autonomous institute of the Department of Biotechnology from its temporary location at International Centre for Genetic Engineering and Biotechnology, New Delhi. NBRC was awarded the status of deemed university by Ministry of Education in 2002. On 16 December 2003, NBRC was moved to the foothills of the Aravalli Range in Manesar.

In the year 2006, National Neuroimaging facility was established that was fully equipped with state-of-the-art equipment, such as a 3 tesla magnetic resonance imaging scanner, electroencephalography, and evoked potential recording. In the following year, a Translational and Clinical Neuroscience Unit was formed along with a Neurology Outpatient Department to Civil Hospital, Gurgaon, to help common people and assess the occurrence of neurological cases in this region. Further, the Centre of Excellence for Epilepsy, jointly administered by NBRC and All India Institute of Medical Sciences, was established in 2005. Two major flagship programs by NBRC were initiated in the past few years. By 2017, National Dementia Program was initiated under NBRC’s leadership, whereas by 2019, a flagship program entitled “Comparative mapping of common mental disorders (CMD) over the lifespan” was launched to understand the science of well-being.

Academics

Master of Science (M.Sc. Neuroscience)
NBRC has integrated multidisciplinary teaching programmes in Life Sciences, such as 2-year M.Sc. program in Neuroscience with broad overview of different aspects of Neuroscience. Eligibility criteria:

 Bachelor's degree or equivalent in any branch of science such as Life Sciences / Physics / Chemistry / Mathematics / Statistics / Computer applications / Pharmacy / Veterinary Science / Psychology / Engineering / Technology / Medicine from a recognized Institute / University
 Candidates appearing for the final year of the qualifying examination are also eligible to apply
 Minimum 55% (50% for SC / ST / PH candidates) marks or equivalent grade or grade point average from secondary (10th) examination onwards is required. Candidates should calculate their percentage up to two decimal points to determine their eligibility

Doctor of Philosophy (Ph.D. Neuroscience)
NBRC offers 5-year Ph.D. program in Neuroscience to students from diverse backgrounds who have a master's degree in any branch related to Neuroscience as mentioned below:
Eligibility criteria:
 Master's degree or equivalent in any branch of science, such as Life Sciences / Physics / Chemistry / Mathematics / Statistics / Computer applications / Pharmacy / Veterinary Science / Psychology from a recognized Institute / University
 Students who have done a minimum of four-years of course-work leading to a bachelor's degree or equivalent in Engineering / Technology / Medicine from a recognized Institute / University
 Candidates appearing for the final year of the qualifying examination are also eligible to apply
 Minimum 55% (50% for SC / ST / PH candidates) marks or equivalent grade or grade point average from the secondary (10th) examination onwards is required. Candidates should calculate their percentage up to two decimal points to determine their eligibility

Summer Training
NBRC conducts summer training programs wherein trainees attend seminars and journal clubs organized at the institute and get exposure to neuroscience.

Research
Research faculty studies the complexities of brain functions and cognition in health and diseases. Research at NBRC is organized into five divisions: 1) Cellular neuroscience and Molecular neuroscience, 2) Systems neuroscience, 3) Cognitive neuroscience, 4) Computational neuroscience, and 5) Translational neuroscience. Nevertheless, faculty collaborates across divisions and other scientists. Research develops therapeutic tools and platforms to assess and cure brain disorders, including Alzheimer’s disease, Parkinson’s disease, dementia, Japanese encephalitis, Zika virus disease, NeuroAIDS, brain tumor, spinal cord injury, and stroke. The research focuses on detailed understanding of our senses of touch, hearing, speech learning, memory, and spatial navigation. Moreover, basic research helps plan clinical trials for the development of rational therapy for brain disorders. Researchers have also been studying the implications of SARS-CoV-2 on the brain.

Major Research Programmes
Dementia Science Program: This is a national level multi-centric program that provides insights into the prevalence of dementia and discover biomarkers, risk factors, and protective factors. These factors play a major role in the conversion of MCI to dementia among elderly. For the diagnosis and classification of dementia, all centers use robust uniform criteria that are internationally accepted, adapted, and validated in the Indian context. Findings could help formulate national-level policies for understanding and treating MCI in elderly.
Comparative mapping of common mental disorders (CMD) over the lifespan: This flagship program understands how information-processing networks in the brain are affected in CMD, including anxiety, depression, obsessive-compulsive disorder, and post-traumatic stress disorder. The program also studies underlying brain mechanisms that differentiate between these disorders, and whether these networks are affected in the same manner in different age groups.

Technological Advancement

Dyslexia Assessment for Languages of India (DALI): A package developed using screening tools, remediation kit, and specific assessment tools to identify dyslexia. It integrates four languages (Hindi, Kannada, Marathi, and English).
KALPANA: An integrative package for visualization, preprocessing, and quantitation of MR spectroscopy (MRS) data acquired using MRS imaging and MEshcher-Garwood–Point-RESolved Spectroscopy (MEGA-PRESS).
NINS-STAT: A MATLAB-based statistical analysis toolbox: A high-performance state-of-the-art automated statistical test selection and execution software package with clinical research applications.
BRAHMA template: First accurate high-resolution brain template developed for analyzing structural and functional neuroimaging data specific for Indian population.
BHARAT: A multimodality-based Hadoop-based big data decision framework, validated using fMRI, integrates non-invasive MRI, MRS, and neuropsychological test outcomes to identify early diagnostic biomarkers of AD.
PRATEEK: The integration of data gathered from multimodal brain imaging systems at various Regions of Interest (ROIs) avails wealth of information about tissue microenvironment and its association with structural and functional changes in healthy or diseased condition.
Stimulus Timing Integrated Module (STIM): A synchronized system to be used in fMRI for mapping brain activity non-invasively in various conditions for normal healthy as well as for clinical evaluation with brain disorders.
GAURI: A methodical system that uses adaptive pattern recognition and learning schemes for predictive single or differential diagnosis of diseases, such as Alzheimer's and Parkinson's Disease, designed with MRI modalities and neuropsychological batteries.
ANSH: ANSH database brings critical neurochemical information from HO, MCI, and AD patients to facilitate collaborative research and multi-site global data sharing for comparative analysis.
Development of a well-characterized hNSC/iPSC-induced pluripotent cell platform: Scientists have developed a well-characterized model of human neural stem cells (hNSCs) to understand cellular–molecular functions of healthy and diseased brain. The NSCs work has been expanded by establishing a human inducible pluripotent cells platform.
SWADESH: This was developed as an advanced automated neuro-tool to aid the early diagnosis of AD. This tool consists of several computer-assisted tools for data pre-processing, quality control, data preparation, analysis, evaluation, and assessment. The fundamental objective of this proposal is to benefit the Indian population by developing a comprehensive neuro-tool. It provides a scheme for MRI-, MRS-, and fMRI-based data generation, processing scheme of multimodal neuroimaging and neuro-spectroscopy data in a single window to achieve a conclusive outcome for the early diagnosis of brain disorders.

Major Research Breakthroughs

Novel ways to tackle Alzheimer's Disease:
Scientists have been studying the early biomarkers for AD using brain chemicals. Monitoring glutathione (GSH), an antioxidant molecule in the brain, aids in the early identification of AD and mapping out therapeutic invention. Scientists have demonstrated that hippocampus, frontal, and cingulate cortical regions responsible for memory and higher cognitive functions, respectively, show significant GSH depletion, leading to cognitive decline. Using 31P MRS, scientists discovered that pH of the left hippocampal formation in AD shifts towards alkalinity. Research has also demonstrated the existence of two open-and-closed conformations of GSH in healthy young participants. Presently, they are investigating the role of two GSH conformations and link between iron deposition and oxidative stress (OS) in the hippocampal formation in AD. Although the exact cause of AD remains unknown, OS is considered a potential factor. Additionally, researchers at NBRC have proposed a novel prospective single-center parallel-arm double-blinded placebo-controlled phase III randomized trial using GSH as a dietary supplement for MCI patients, while monitoring brain GSH levels and cognitive profile using non-invasive MRS and neuropsychological testing, respectively.

Brain stress mapping in COVID-19 survivors:
Considering the elevating cases of depression, obsessive-compulsive disorder, anxiety, and post-traumatic stress disorder in patients with COVID-19, scientists have been mapping brains of patients who recovered from or were asymptomatic to COVID-19. This first global study analyzed structural, spectroscopic, and behavioral changes in the brains of recovered/asymptomatic patients using a novel non-invasive MRS neuroimaging technique. Findings suggest that glutamate and GABA levels are potential parameters to monitor mental health and psychiatric disease-associated conditions. Moreover, antioxidants and neurotransmitters in the study have potential implications for psychiatric disorders in COVID-19-affected patients.

Role of thalamo cortical interactions in reorganization of directed information flow with aging in brain networks:
Scientists studied the specific role of the human thalamus as causal outflow hub in reorganizing directed information flow and connectivity among large-scale major neurocognitive networks during brain aging. This reorganization of directed functional connectivity with age during spontaneous activity highlights the importance of subcortical areas even during stimulus independent processing. Outcomes lead to understanding the crucial role of the thalamus as a major integrative hub in addition to insular network for mediating key cognitive functional dynamics and their role during maintenance of cognitive functions during healthy aging process in the human brain.

Identification of protein that helps dengue and JE viruses to multiply inside host:
In this collaborative study, it was discovered that dengue and JE viruses activate platelet inside host and induce them release platelet factor 4 (PF4). PF4 inhibits the activity of immune cells, thus stopping interferon production. PF4 acts through its receptor CXCR3, which when blocked with an antagonist AMG487 inhibits dengue and JE replication both in vivo and in vitro. This study indicates the possibility of developing an antiviral agent.

ZV envelop (E) protein alters properties of human fetal neural stem cells by modulating microRNA circuitry:
This study focused on delineating molecular mechanisms, role of miRNAs, and involvement of ZV E protein in ZV-induced microcephaly. The protein promotes premature but faulty formation of neurons, which affects normal properties of brain stem cells. This is the potential reason behind ZV-induced small head size in infants. Nearly 25 miRNAs, regulating genes and protein expression in cells, were identified as important factors impacting the cell division, proliferation and stemness of the brain stem cells.

let-7 miRNA controls CED-7 homotypic adhesion and EFF-1-mediated axonal self-fusion to restore touch sensation following injury:
This work on focused on the regeneration of nervous system, wherein lost neuronal function was found to be restored after injury in roundworm model. The findings established that the axon fusion process has functional significance in the maintenance of neuronal integrity throughout the life span of an organism. The researchers also demonstrated how to control this process genetically for treating nerve injuries in humans in future.

Glycyrrhizin prevents SARS-CoV-2 S1 and Orf3a induced high mobility group box 1 (HMGB1) release and inhibits viral replication:
An active ingredient Glycyrrhizin in Mulethi (liquorice)—a commonly used herb—is a potential source for the development of a drug against COVID-19. HMGB1 is crucial for regulating susceptibility to SARS-CoV-2, whereas S-receptor binding body (RBD) and Orf3a proteins are required for maximal SARS-CoV replication and virulence. The study investigated whether Glycyrrhizin affects SARS-CoV-2 S-RBD- and Orf3a-mediated HMGB1 release and cell death in lung cells expressing SARS-CoV-2 viral proteins. Glycyrrhizin did not only reverse S-RBD- and Orf3a-induced extracellular HMGB1 release but also abrogated caspase-1 activation and rescued cell death. Benefits of anti-inflammatory properties in glycyrrhizin are: 1) Lowering the severity of the disease, 2) Mitigating viral replication by as much as 90%, and 3) Fighting the “storm of cytokines.”

Facilities & Services

 Distributed Information Center (DIC): DIC is established under the initiative of BTISNET initiative of DBT. DIC manages information and communications technology (ICT) and e-governance activities of NBRC. It provides ICT science & technology services.
 Experimental animal facility: This animal facility is registered with the Committee for the Purpose of Control and Supervision of Experiments on Animals, Ministry of Environment and Forests, Government of India, New Delhi. The facility contains animal models, including primates and transgenic mice. Detailed training programs for veterinary and husbandry care and peer-reviewed evaluation of all protocols are followed.
 National neuroimaging facility
 Neuroimaging and neurospectroscopy laboratory: This laboratory functions on the metabolic analysis of different neurodegenerative disorders (e.g., AD, PD) using MRS technique to identify biomarkers in and measure quantitative stress of age-matched healthy adults and patients.
 Centre for Excellence for Epilepsy/MEG facility: This center studies epileptogenesis, better diagnosis, and localization of epileptogenic foci and new therapeutic techniques.
 Library: The library consists of automated open-access system and provides information services and access to bibliographical and full-text digital and printed resources for on-campus user community.
 DBT’s Electronic Library Consortium (DeLCON): This is an initiative by DBT that gives unlimited access to most of the relevant periodicals to researchers. It gives access to high-quality e-resources. It provides current (1000+ online resources) and archival access to >1176 core peer-reviewed journals and one bibliographic database (SCOPUS) in different disciplines from 21 foreign publishers.
 Speech and Language Laboratory (SALLY): Research in this lab focuses on unravelling cortical pathways involved in Hindi–English biscriptal adults and children.
 Computational neuroscience and neuroimaging laboratory: The unit works on imaging-based diagnosis of neurodegenerative diseases and planning pulsed radiotherapy and chemotherapy for treating brain tumors from translational medicine aspect.
 Translational & clinical neuroscience unit: This unit provides neurological OPD services and assesses the occurrence of neurological cases in Gurgaon. Patients visiting the unit have access to several facilities, including MRI, computed tomography, etc.

Campus & Infrastructure

 Hostel accommodation: There are two on-campus hostel buildings and one building as staff quarters.
 Medical facilities: NBRC has a full-time resident medical officer as well as on-site OPD service. In case of medical emergencies, a full-time transport system transports patients to nearest hospitals.
 Conveyance: NBRC is connected to New Delhi and Jaipur via NH8. NBRC provides transport services, including bus and car, to students and staff. For those staying off-campus, daily shuttle services are provided.
 Sports: Outdoor and indoor sports, including football and table tennis, are organized by the Sports Committee. 
 Tantrika: This student-organized annual event, including several competitions and programmes, is hosted by second-year Ph.D. students for newcomers.
 Green Canopy Committee: In February 2021, GCC was constituted for spreading environmental awareness and education through eco-friendly environmental development programs, focusing on using sustainable energy to reduce carbon footprint.
 Wildlife: NBRC is surrounded by keekar forests of Aravalli mountain range. From its inception, NBRC has been maintaining the surrounding jungle and has planted several trees and shrubs in the campus. There are over 100 different kinds of birds in and around NBRC, such as Jungle Babbler, Oriental Magpie Robin, Bulbul, Collared Dove, Rose-ringed Parakeet, Drongo, and Indian Peafowls. Several bird-watching programs are conducted regularly for students and staff.

References 

Neuroscience research centres in India
Research institutes in India
Deemed universities in India
Organisations based in Delhi